The mountain thornbill (Acanthiza katherina) is a species of bird in the family Acanthizidae. It is endemic to Australia.

Its natural habitat is tropical rainforest on the Atherton Tableland in north-east Queensland.

References

mountain thornbill
Birds of Cape York Peninsula
Endemic birds of Australia
mountain thornbill
Taxonomy articles created by Polbot